Turtle Island may refer to:

Places

Americas 
 Turtle Island (Native American folklore), a name used by several Native American cultures to refer to North America or the Earth in general
 Turtle Island, Bermuda
 Another name for Tortuga, an island in Haiti
 Turtle Island (Lake Erie), near Toledo, Ohio
 La Tortue, Saint Barthélemy, or Turtle Island, in the French Caribbean

Asia and Oceania 
 Turtle Island (Newcastle Bay), in the Torres Strait Islands archipelago in Australia
 Turtle Islands National Park, a collective name for three islands in Sabah, Malaysia
 Another name for Kusu Island, an island in Singapore
 Another name for Ko Tao, an island in Thailand

Fiji
 Another name for Nanuya Levu, a privately owned island of the Yasawa Group in Fiji
 Another name for Vatoa, in the Lau Group in Fiji

Philippines
 Turtle Island, Negros Oriental, a peninsula in the southern coast of Negros Island in the Philippines
 Turtle Islands, Tawi-Tawi, a group of islands in the Southern Philippines

Taiwan 
 Turtle Island (Matsu), an island in Beigan, Matsu, Lienchiang County, Fujian Province, Taiwan
 Another name for Guishan Island, an island off the northeast coast of Taiwan

In media, arts and entertainment

Music 
 Turtle Island (album), the 1989 debut solo album by Paul Hyde of the Payola$
 "Turtle Island", a track from Mike Oldfield's Tr3s Lunas album
 "Turtle Island", a track from Beach House's 2008 Devotion album
 Turtle Island Quartet, modern-day jazz string quartet

Print 
 Turtle Island (book), a 1974 book of poetry by Gary Snyder, winner of the Pulitzer Prize for Poetry
 Turtle Island: Tales of the Algonquian Nations, a 1999 children's book by Jane Louise Curry
 Turtle Island News, Canadian Native People's newspaper

Other uses 
 Turtle Island Foods, makers of the Tofurky brand of soy products
 Turtle Island (horse), (born 1991), British-trained thoroughbred racehorse
 Turtle Island Recycling, established in 1990 in Toronto, it was recycling and waste company that was merged into GFL Environmental in 2012.

See also
 Turtle Islands (disambiguation)
 Aspidochelone, a fabled sea creature, said to be mistaken for an island
 Turtle Mountain (disambiguation)

References